Ricote is a Spanish municipality in the  autonomous community of Murcia. It has a population of 1,509 (2004) and an area of 87.7 km2.

Ricote had a community of Moriscos until their expulsion from Spain in 1609. Govert Westerveld  and Francisco Márquez Villanueva believe that the name of the Morisco character Ricote in Don Quixote is derived from the village.

Demographics 
3.79% of the inhabitants were foreigners in 2019. 2.21% are Africans, 1.34% are Americans. The table below shows the population trends.

Economy 
23.2% of the surface is utilised as crop lands. The most widely grown products are the almonds, the lemons and the olives. 48.21 agreements were written for jobs in agriculture and fishing sector in 2019, and 35.16% were signed by crop lands labourers in the second half of 2016. 46.87% were written by enterprises of the service sector, and 13.19% were signed by waiters. Only 1.78% of the agreements occurred in the industry sector.
Since the onset of Covid in 2018 the local economy in Ricote Valley has been growing as rentals of rural houses with no neighbours has become a source of income for locals. Thanks to apps like booking.com, airbnb, and Spaniards' desire to vacation without neighbours this region of Spain has experienced a small boom in its economy. There are, as of January 2021, 298 country houses for rent, more than in any other part of Spain. As well since 2020 the building industry has taken notice of the post covid trend to build bedroom communities in the Ricote valley where Murcia residents live all year, not just on weekends or summer. The travel is 35 minutes to Murcia city.

Facilities 
The municipality is home to a consultorio(a primary care centre with the fewest functions), an early childhood and primary education centre and a library.

Main sights 
Some buildings with architectural and history values are listed below:
 Palacio de la Encomienda de Santiago
 Palacio de Llamas: It was built in 1702.
 San Sebastián Parish Church: It was built in the 18 century.

References

This article contains information from the Spanish Wikipedia article Ricote, accessed on January 10, 2008.

Municipalities in the Region of Murcia
Moriscos